The 1996 BPR 4 Hours of Silverstone was the fourth race of the 1996 BPR Global GT Series. It was run at the Silverstone Circuit on 12 May 1996. The race was also appointed the British Empire Trophy.

Official results
Class winners in bold.  Cars failing to complete 75% of winner's distance marked as Not Classified (NC).

Statistics
 Pole Position - #24 Bigazzi Team SRL - 1:47.044
 Fastest Lap - #28 Ennea Igol - 1:49.780

References

External links
 Race Results
 Photo Archive

Silverstone
Silverstone